Joseph Gwyn Davies (b St Davids 18 October 1890 – d Newport 17 March 1952) was Dean of Monmouth from 1946 until his death.

Davies was educated at St David's School, St David's College, Lampeter, Keble College, Oxford and Trinity College, Dublin; and ordained in 1916. After curacies in Llanelly and Aberystwyth he was Vicar of Llanganten. From 1926 to 1929 he was Chaplain at Valparaiso. He then held incumbencies in Talgarth, Cardiff and Sketty. He was also Grand Chaplain of the United Grand Lodge of England from 1947 to 1948.

References

1890 births
People from St Davids
People educated at Ysgol Dewi Sant
Alumni of the University of Wales, Lampeter
Alumni of Keble College, Oxford
Alumni of Trinity College Dublin
Welsh Anglicans
Deans of Monmouth
1952 deaths